Aminath Faiza (ca. 29 September 1924 – 25 February 2011) was a Maldivian Dhivehi language poet and author.

Biography
(Daisy Maa) Aminath Faiza began to write poetry at the age of 16. She was inspired by the late "Bodufen Valhugey Seedhi", a famous poet and Faiza's maternal uncle. "Thiththibe" as Faiza called him, made her recite his poems when they were completed. During the 1950s, Faiza started showcasing her work, during which time, late Mohamed Amin Didi, the first President of the Maldives, created the "Lhen Veringe Gulzaar" (Garden of Dhivehi Poets). Aminath Faiza was the "DAISY MAA"; the Daisy flower of Maldivian poetry. Since then, she has published her poems and other works in magazines and newspapers, and has had compilations published in books throughout her career. She wrote poetry on many different topics including romance, social issues, religion, national unity, and national occasions.

Faiza served on the advisory body of the Rayyithunge Muthagaddim Party, the first political party founded in the Maldives by late president Mohamed Ameed Didi. She worked as the deputy headmistress of the former Madrasat–ul Saniyya school. Faiza also worked for Maldives Center for Historical and Linguistic Research, during which she helped to compile the Maldivian Dictionary.

In recognition of her contribution to Maldivian poetry, she was awarded the National Award of Recognition in 1980, then a National Award of Honour in 1996. She penned her last poem on the Golden Jubilee of Iskandhar School on 5 February 2011.

On February 25, 2011 after suffering a stroke, she died at the age of 86 while being treated at Indira Gandhi Memorial Hospital in Malé, Republic of Maldives. A funeral prayer was held at Masjid Al Sultan Mohamed Thankurufaanu Al Auzam following Friday prayers. She was buried at the Aa Sahara cemetery in Male in a ceremony attended by political and cultural dignitaries.
She had 3 children Ahmed Abbas, Aminath Abbas and Mohamed Hilmy

References

External links
 Website with archives of Faiza's works
 A national figure who provided inspiration for thousands of young women and men - Maldives National University

2011 deaths
Maldivian poets
Maldivian women poets
Maldivian women writers
1920s births
20th-century poets
20th-century women writers
21st-century women writers
20th-century Maldivian writers
21st-century Maldivian writers